is a railway station located in Makurazaki, Kagoshima, Japan.
The station opened in 1931 and is the southernmost conventional rail terminal station in Japan.

Line 
Kyushu Railway Company
Ibusuki Makurazaki Line

Layout

History 
The station opened on March 10, 1931, when private Nansatsu Railway (now Kagoshima Kotsu) extended the Makurazaki Line from Kaseda to Makurazaki. The old station building was owned by the same company until its demolishment in 2006. The JNR paid access charges to Nansatsu Railway for the use of the station, and the station was not counted as an official JNR station until the subsequent closure of the Makurazaki Line.

The operation of the Makurazaki Line was suspended on June 21, 1983, due to a flood. The line was abandoned and officially closed on March 18, 1984. Only the Ibusuki Makurazaki Line has served the station since then.

In 2006, the land on which the station stood was sold to Taiyo, a local supermarket chain. As a result, on May 1, 2006, the station was moved approximately 100 meters towards Kagoshima. The new station on opening had no station building, but one was subsequently constructed from local donation funding. Unveiled on April 28, 2013, the new building received the Good Design Award in the same year. The station has a single platform.

Adjacent stations

Nearby places
Taiyo Market Store
Makurazaki Port
Makurazaki City Hall
Makurazaki-Nagisa HotSpa

References 

Railway stations in Kagoshima Prefecture
Railway stations in Japan opened in 1931